Víctor Alberto Gil Mallma (April 8, 1928; Ayacucho – July 14, 1975; Lima), better known as Picaflor de Los Andes, was a Peruvian folk singer. In his childhood, he worked as a driver, painter, construction worker, and bricklayer.  He sold approximately 80,000 copies of the single "Corazón mañoso" in 1960, thereby becoming a cultural icon and obtaining the name "Picaflor de los Andes".

He died on July 14, 1975, in the district of La Oroya; there were more than 100,000 people at his burial.

Discography
Albums
 El Genio del Huaytapallana
 Por las rutas del recuerdo
 Santísima virgen de Cocharcas
 Un paso mas en la vida
 Yo soy huancaíno
 Bodas de Plata
 Un pasajero en el camino

Contributing artist
 The Rough Guide to the Music of the Andes (1996, World Music Network)

External links 
 Page dedicated to Picaflor de los Andes

References

Peruvian musicians
1928 births
1975 deaths